Gyeon Hwon (867 – 27 September 936, r. 892 – March 934) was the king and founder of Later Baekje, one of the Later Three Kingdoms of Korea, and reigned from 892 to 935. Some records render his name as "Jin Hwon" (진훤). He was also the progenitor of the Hwanggan Gyeon clan. Substantial accounts of his life are preserved in the Samguk Sagi, which presents a single narrative, and the Samguk Yusa, which presents excerpts about him from various sources.

Background
Records say that Gyeon Hwon was born Lee, not Gyeon. Most accounts agree that Gyeon Hwon's father was Ajagae, a farmer of the Lee clan, and that he was born in what is today Gaeun-eup in Mungyeong, North Gyeongsang province, as the oldest of six children. However, Gyeon Hwon later changed his family name to Gyeon. Some argue that he changed his surname to start afresh as the founder of Hubaekje. Gyeon Hwon is also the founder of the Hwanggan clan of the Gyeons. His sons, Singeom, Yanggeom, Yonggeom and Geumgang, are also listed as gyeon (Jin), not Lee.

His mother was from the Gwangju area, but her exact identity is not known; Ajagae had two wives, Lady Sangwon and Lady Namwon, and Gyeon Hwon was born to his first wife. However, legend says that his mother was from Gwangju and gave birth to her firstborn son after having physical contact with a worm disguised as a man, and that Gyeon Hwon grew up drinking the milk of a tiger.

The Silla court of Queen Jinseong was heavily corrupted and embroiled with political confusion. Widespread famine ravaged the country, driving many of the people into rebel forces. Village headmen, and new military forces arose and created power bases all over the country. The government who had tried to implement a forceful taxation plan found itself in the face of rebellions led by bandits, local nobles, and rebel leaders. It was during this time that Gyeon Hwon's father Ajagae led a local peasant revolt and set up base in Sangju.

Early life and founding of Hubaekje
Gyeon Hwon is said to have left home at 15 to join the Silla army and became the commander of Silla forces in the Jeolla region. While his father grabbed power in the Sangju region, he independently marshalled local peasants to his cause, and soon gathered many followers. In 892, Gyeon Hwon seized the cities of Wansanju and Mujinju, taking over the old territory of Baekje and winning the support of the people in the area who were hostile to Silla.

Gyeon Hwon declared himself the king of Hubaekje ("later Baekje") and established his capital at Wansanju in 900. He established government, made diplomatic ties with China, and continuously pursued the expansion of his kingdom amidst much conflict with Gung Ye of Hugoguryeo.

Reign
After crowning himself as ruler of Hubaekje, Gyeon Hwon sent his army to present-day Hapcheon, southwest of the Silla capital Gyeongju, but the campaign failed and the army retreated. Then in 910, when Wang Geon, the general of the rival kingdom of Hugoguryeo, attacked and captured the city of Naju, the very city in which Gyeon Hwon had started his rebellion, he made an attempt to retake the city from Wang but failed.

In 918, Gung Ye, who had been maintaining his rule by acts of terror, was dethroned and murdered by his own army commanders. General and chief minister Wang Geon was crowned as their new ruler, marking the beginning point of Goryeo.

Gyeon Hwon sent another major expedition to Hapcheon in 920 and finally succeeded in taking over the region, forcing King Gyeongmyeong into an alliance with Goryeo. Then he invaded the present-day Andong area, but his troops were defeated by local Silla guards. Gyeon Hwon was forced to make peace with Goryeo after the battle, through a hostage exchange of royal family members. However, when his nephew Jin Ho died, he killed the Goryeo hostage Wang Shin, cousin of Wang Geon, and resumed war against Goryeo.

In 927, Gyeon Hwon led his army himself and directly attacked the Silla capital of Gyeongju. King Gyeongae was unprepared for this attack, and he chose suicide over capture by the invading army of Hubaekje. Gyeon Hwon then established Kim Bu (who became King Gyeongsun) as the next Silla king. On his way back, he was met by the forces led by Wang Geon, and easily defeated the Goryeo army, killing many of Wang's notable generals and warriors, with Wang barely escaping through the daring self-sacrifice of his general Shin Sung-gyeom and Kim Nak. One year later he took over the city of Jinju from Silla.

Decline and fall
Hubaekje and Goryeo were in constant state of hostilities without one being completely dominant over the other. However, in 930, the Hubaekje troops faced a heavy defeat at the Battle of Gochang (present-day Andong) and was unable to recover from the loss. Gyeon Hwon attempted to reverse the current by sacking the Goryeo capital of Gaeseong, but his army suffered another defeat in 934.

Not only was Hubaekje reeling from military defeats, the kingdom was in internal disarray. In 935, Gyeon Hwon's eldest son Singeom, who had been slighted as heir to the throne in favor of his younger brother Geumgang, overthrew Gyeon Hwon with the aid of his brothers Yanggeom and Yonggeom. Singeom killed Geumgang and confined Gyeon Hwon to Geumsan Temple, but Gyeon Hwon escaped and fled to Goryeo and his old enemy Wang Geon, who welcomed him and provided him with land and slaves.

King Gyeongsun of Silla formally surrendered to Goryeo in 935. The following year, at Gyeon Hwon's request, he and Wang Geon led a massive Goryeo army to Hubaekje and the kingdom fell.

Gyeon Hwon died the same year of an inflamed tumor.

Diplomacy
Unlike his rival Gung Ye, Gyeon Hwon was active in diplomacy; he was formally confirmed by the Chinese kingdoms of Wuyue and Later Tang as the legitimate ruler of Hubaekje. In addition, he sought an alliance with the newly formed Liao Dynasty in the north, which was founded by the Khitans, in order to surround Goryeo from both north and south. Gyeon Hwon also sent envoys to Japan during his reign for mainly commercial reasons; the Jeolla region, where Gyeon Hwon began his kingdom, was the center of trade in East Asia during the period and had already served as the base for traders such as Jang Bogo.

However, despite all of his diplomatic, military and trade abilities Gyeon Hwon lacked the political astuteness to found a viable state; his Hubaekje government system was not very much different from the one of Silla, which had been proven to be ineffective in centralizing the power of the local landlords and merchants. In the end, Hubaekje was not able to exercise influence over many of its people, paving the way for Goryeo to incorporate the kingdom and unify the Korean peninsula.

Wives and children

In Samguk Sagi
Wives
Unnamed primary wife
Lady Gobi (고비녀, 古比女) – concubine, mother of his 6th son
Children
1st son Gyeon Sin-geom (견신검, 甄神劍; 885–936)
2nd son Gyeon Yang-geom (견양검, 甄良劍; d. 936)
3rd son Gyeon Yong-geom (견용검, 甄龍劍; d. 936)
4th son Gyeon Geum-gang (견금강, 甄金剛; d. 935)
8th son Gyeon Neung-ye (견능예, 甄能乂)
1st daughter Gyeon Ae-bok (견애복, 甄哀福)

In Samguk Yusa
Wife
Lady Sangwon of the Bak clan (상원부인 박씨, 上院夫人 朴氏)
Children
1st son Gyeon Seong (견성, 甄成)
2nd son Gyeon Gyeom-noe (견겸뇌, 甄謙腦)
3rd son Gyeon Yong-sul (견용술, 甄龍述)
4th son Gyeon Chong-ji (견총지, 甄聰智)
5th son Gyeon Jong-u (견종우, 甄宗祐)
7th son Gyeon Wi-heung (견위흥, 甄位興)
8th son Gyeon Cheong-gu (견청구, 甄靑丘)
1st daughter Grand Lady Gyeon of State (국대부인 견씨, 國大夫人 甄氏)

Popular culture
 Portrayed by Seo In-seok in the 2000-2002 KBS1 TV series Taejo Wang Geon.

See also
Later Baekje
Gung Ye
Wanggeon
Later Three Kingdoms
History of Korea

References

867 births
936 deaths
Korean rulers
Baekje
Silla people
10th-century rulers in Asia
Year of birth uncertain
People from Sangju
People related with Late Three Kingdoms